The California Cup Mile is an American thoroughbred horse race run annually at Santa Anita Park in Arcadia, California during its Oak Tree Racing Association meet in the fall of the year. Raced on turf over a distance of  one mile, it is open to horses three-year-olds and up of either gender who were bred in the state of California. The event currently offers a purse of $175,000 and a trophy.

The California Cup Mile is part of the "California Cup Day" series of races intended to call attention to, and to honor, the California Thoroughbred racing and breeding industry.

Past winners

 2008 - Swift Winds (Alonso Quinonez)
 2007 - Unusual Suspect
 2006 - Epic Power
 2005 - Drake's Victory
 2004 - A To The Z
 2003 - Lennyfromalibu
 2002 - Turkish Prize
 2001 - Native Desert
 2000 - Road To Slew
 1999 - Native Desert
 1998 - Indiahoma
 1997 - Gastown
 1996 - Half Mamoon
 1995 - Megan's Interco
 1994 - Blaze O'Brien
 1993 - Megan's Interco
 1992 - Blaze O'Brien
 1991 - Shirkee
 1990 - Gum

References
 Oak Tree racing meet at Santa Anita
 California Cup Mile at Pedigree Query.com

Horse races in California
Santa Anita Park
Graded stakes races in the United States
Turf races in the United States
Racing series for horses